Stolta stad! (Proud city!) is Epistle No. 33 in the Swedish poet and performer Carl Michael Bellman's 1790 song collection, Fredman's Epistles. One of his best-known works, it combines both spoken (with words in German, Danish, Swedish, and French) and sung sections (in Swedish). In the spoken sections, Bellman, as composer and as performer, imitates a whole crowd of people of many descriptions. It has been described as Swedish literature's most congenial portrait of the country's capital city, Stockholm.

The epistle is subtitled "1:o Om Fader Movitz's öfverfart til Djurgården, och 2:o om den dygdiga Susanna." (Firstly about father Movitz's crossing to Djurgården, and secondly about the virtuous Susanna). Performances of the epistle have been recorded by Fred Åkerström and by Sven-Bertil Taube.

Background

Epistle 

The epistle is dated 16 October 1771.

Spoken sections 

The Epistle begins with a long spoken section, starting with "Was ist das?" (German for "What's that?"), imitative of a motley crowd waiting on the Stockholm quayside at Skeppsbron in the old town, Gamla stan, with people relaxing while others try to move about. They are speaking in Swedish, German, French, and a few words of Danish. In the crush are milk sellers, sailors, pastry sellers, prostitutes, an acrobat dressed as a harlequin, a man with some dancing bears, a German with a monkey on his shoulder, and a customs officer, who cheerfully calls himself a "customs snake". A soldier is squatting to defecate, people are playing a game of cards with trumps, and someone is trying to play the French horn. Two shorter spoken sections are interspersed with the sung sections.

Music and verse form 

The song has four verses, with two further spoken sections. Each verse has twelve lines, with the rhyming pattern AABBCCDDDEEE; of these, the lines AA both begin with Corno, horn, and all the lines CDD and EEE end with Corno; the first verse mentions Movitz, a musician, and one of the stock characters in Fredman's Epistles. The song is in  time in the key of A major, and is marked Marche. The Epistle is dated 16 October 1771. Three of the spoken sections end with a mention that a "nymph", Susanna, is to sing; only this and No. 67 (Fader Movitz, bror) among the epistles call for a woman's voice, but the identify of "Susanna" is not known.

Lyrics 

Like the spoken sections, the lyrics portray the life of Stockholm, with mentions of buildings, ships, flags, and the noisy mixed crowd on a boat, crossing the harbour from Skeppsbron quay to Djurgården. There is drinking and song, and the beautiful Ulla Winblad is closely observed. The last stanza hints at sex in the boat.

Reception and legacy 

Carina Burman notes in her biography of Bellman that Bellman knew the Skeppsbron area of Stockholm intimately, as it lay just outside his office in the General Directorate of Customs. She likens his description of the harbourside to that in Fredman's Songs no. 65, "So I look out at the shore", which includes the lyrics

The scholar of Swedish literature Lars Lönnroth writes that the long prose section of the "famous" epistle 33 is the culmination of Bellman's skill with one particular dramatic technique, the ability to depict a whole crowd at once, among them his invented cast, Fredman's drinking-companions. That, he notes, immediately poses a question, namely, which voice is Fredman's amidst the tumult on Skeppsbro. Evidently Fredman is no longer, as in some of the epistles, a preacher or apostle of the gospel of brandy-drinking, but merely one of many actors in the scene, "drowned in a sea of voices". Only when he starts singing, Lönnroth writes, does the voice become unambiguously Fredman's, singing Stockholm's praises. This extreme development of narrative technique, he notes, departs completely from the original epistle format. Citing the Epistle, Anita Ankarcrona observes that Bellman was "the first, and perhaps the greatest, of all Stockholm depicters".

The Bellman Society observes that Sweden's capital has never been portrayed with mightier trumpet blasts or more skilfully than in this Epistle, "Swedish literature's most congenial portrait of Stockholm." In its view, the work is neither poem nor song, but a song-drama of a kind created by Bellman himself out of a susurrus of voices around Skeppsbron. Soundscape, it suggests, turns into "a landscape painting, a stunningly beautiful snapshot of a Stockholm crowd in the 1770s".
Writing in the Haga-Brunnsviken Nytt, Gunnel Bergström notes that in verse 3, Ulla Winblad climbs on board, and Movitz becomes randy.

Göran Hassler states in his annotated selection of Bellman's work that the Epistle has been recorded in interestingly different interpretations by Fred Åkerström on his 1977 studio album Vila vid denna källa, and by Sven-Bertil Taube on his 1959 album Carl Michael Bellman. It has been performed in costume by Thord Lindé. A tour company that shows people around Bellman's Stockholm has chosen the name "Stolta Stad".

Notes

References

Sources 

 
 
 
  (contains the most popular Epistles and Songs, in Swedish, with sheet music)
  (with facsimiles of sheet music from first editions in 1790, 1791)

External links 

 Text of Epistle 33 on Bellman.net

1790 compositions
Swedish songs
Fredmans epistlar